The Norwegian Peace Council (Norwegian: Norges Fredsråd) is the largest peace organisation in Norway. It is an umbrella organisation of 19 non-governmental organisations concerned with peace. It was founded on 25 October 1945 by seven NGOs.

Member organisations
 Antikrigs-initiativet
 Bestemødre for fred
 Changemaker
 CISV Norway
 Hardangerakademiet
 IFOR Norge
 Women's International League for Peace and Freedom Norway
 Internasjonal Dugnad
 International Organisation of Good Templars Norway
 Juvente
 Nansen Peace Centre
 Student Christian Movement in Norway
 Norwegian Peace Association
 International Physicians for the Prevention of Nuclear War Norway
 PBI-Peace Brigades International
 PRESS-Redd Barna Ungdom
 Religious Society of Friends Norway
 YFU Norge (Youth for Understanding Norway)

References

External links
 Official site

Peace organisations based in Norway
Organizations established in 1945
Organisations based in Oslo